U.S. Route 50 (US 50) in West Virginia runs from the border with Ohio to Virginia, passing briefly through Garrett County, Maryland, and following the Northwestern Turnpike.  Prior to the U.S. Highway System it was West Virginia Route 1 and in the 1930s, the road was not finished in Maryland. Today the section of US 50 from Clarksburg to Parkersburg on the Ohio River is part of Corridor D of the Appalachian Development Highway System.

For much of its length, Route 50 roughly parallels the North Bend Rail Trail and crosses the trail at three places.

Route description

Western segment
US 50 crosses the Ohio River on a bridge, with Blennerhassett Island in the middle of the river. It continues as a freeway with two interchanges at Route 892, and runs concurrently with Route 68 starting at the second interchange up to where it exits and heads into downtown Parkersburg. US 50 stays on the southern shore of the Little Kanawha River, intersecting Route 14 and then after crossing the river, Route 47 and Route 618 before becoming a divided expressway at the I-77 interchange. US 50 then briefly turns south before heading east through the forest. South of Deerwalk, the route runs concurrently with Route 31 for a few miles. In Ellenboro, US 50 has an interchange with Route 16, providing access into the town; an intersection with Route 74 does the same for Pennsboro, and several miles later, Route 18 for West Union. Route 23 intersects the highway west of East Salem and Bristol.

Upon entering Clarksburg, there is a diamond interchange with US 19 and Route 20 before US 50 passes through the town as a freeway, with several interchanges, including another with Route 20. After an interchange with I-79, US 50 becomes Main Street, passing through the city of Bridgeport and intersecting Route 131 and passing south of the North Central West Virginia Airport. The route intersects Route 279 and then runs concurrently with US 250 until just before US 50 enters Fetterman and then Grafton. US 50 intersects US 119 in the eastern part of the city before continuing east through Thornton and curving through the mountains to Evansville. Route 92 briefly runs concurrently with the highway, and Route 26 intersects the route near Fellowsville. After several miles through the forest, Route 72 briefly runs concurrently with the highway before US 50 continues east into Aurora and intersects Route 24. Then, US 50 crosses into Maryland.

Eastern segment

US 50 crosses back into West Virginia over the north bank of the Potomac River. After passing through Gormania, the highway continues through the forest, and runs concurrently with Route 42 from near Mount Storm to near Hartmansville. Near Claysville, the route intersects Route 93, and Route 972 intersect US 50 near New Creek. US 220 runs concurrently with US 50 through Ridgeville, Markwood, and Burlington. At Junction, US 220 splits off to the south, and Route 28 continues east with US 50 through Mechanicsburg and through the river plain. In the town of Romney, US 50 goes through downtown, while Route 28 continues north. The highway goes through Shanks and Frenchburg, as well as Augusta; Route 29 runs concurrently through Pleasantdale. US 50 continues east through Hanging Rock and Loom, crossing the Cacapon River in Capon Bridge. US 50 then continues into Virginia.

Water crossings
Mill Branch east of Capon Bridge, West Virginia
Cacapon River via Capon Bridge at Capon Bridge, West Virginia
North River via Hanging Rock Bridge at Hanging Rock
Tearcoat Creek via Pleasant Dale Bridge at Pleasant Dale
North and South Forks of the Little Cacapon River at Frenchburg, West Virginia
South Branch Potomac River via Romney Bridge at Romney
Patterson Creek via Patterson Creek Bridge at Burlington
New Creek via New Creek Bridge at New Creek
North Branch Potomac River via Gormania Bridge at the state line with Maryland
Tygart Valley River via US 50 Bridge at Grafton
West Fork River via US 50 Bridge at Clarksburg
Ohio River via Blennerhassett Island Bridge at Parkersburg

Historic sites

Mineral County
Weaver's Antique Service Station
Claysville Church
Patterson Creek Manor
Saddle Mountain
Travelers Rest

Hampshire County
Hook's Tavern, 1790
Capon Bridge
Frye's Inn, c. 1800
Amos Pugh House
Cooper Mountain Overlook
Hanging Rock
Straw's Country Store Museum
Historic Downtown Romney
West Virginia Schools for the Deaf and Blind, 1846
Hampshire County Courthouse, 1922
Literary Hall, 1870
Indian Mound Cemetery
Mount Pisgah Benevolence Cemetery
Fort Mill Ridge Civil War Trenches
The Burg, built c. 1769
Sloan–Parker House (Stone House), built 1790

Major intersections

References

External links

50
 West Virginia
U.S. Route 050
U.S. Route 050
U.S. Route 050
U.S. Route 050
U.S. Route 050
U.S. Route 050
U.S. Route 050
U.S. Route 050
U.S. Route 050
Northwestern Turnpike